The 1986 ABC Under-18 Championship for Women was the ninth edition of the Asian Basketball Confederation (ABC)'s Junior Championship for Women. The games were held at Manila, Philippines from December 28, 1986, to January 4, 1987.

Venue
The games were held at Rizal Memorial Coliseum, located in Manila. On April 14, 1984, ABC Executive Committee had a meeting at the Walkerhill Hotel, Seoul and decided to hold the next event at Kuala Lumpur, Malaysia, but later changed to Manila, Philippines.

Preliminary round

Final

Final standings

Awards

See also
 1986 ABC Under-18 Championship

References

FIBA Asia Under-18 Championship for Women
ABC Under-18 Championship for Women
ABC Under-18 Championship for Women
ABC Under-18 Championship for Women
ABC Under-18 Championship for Women
International basketball competitions hosted by the Philippines